Iannella is a surname. Notable people with the surname include:

Christopher A. Iannella (1913–1992), American politician
Christopher Iannella Jr. (born 1952), American politician
Monique Iannella (born 1996), Australian footballer
Richard P. Iannella, American politician
Sandy Iannella (born 1987), Italian footballer